

Laguna Tapada also Laguna Las Canchas o Tapada or Laguna Las Conchas is a Bolivian Amazon freshwater lagoon located east of the Beni Department in the Marbán province, it is close to the Santa Cruz department.

Geography 
Tapada lagoon is at an elevation of 206 meters above sea level. With maximum dimensions of 8 km long by 6 km wide in the rainy season and a surface area of 1,901.6 hectares or 19.01 km², it has an average rounded shape. Short distance to the north of it is Laguna Barrientos.

See also 
Laguna Barrientos

References 

Lakes of Beni Department